PRINS may mean:
 The Dutch surname Prins
 PRINS (gene) a non-coding RNA gene